MT63 is a digital radio modulation mode for transmission in high-noise situations developed by Pawel Jalocha SP9VRC. MT63 is designed for keyboard-to-keyboard conversation modes, on HF amateur radio bands.

Description 
MT63 distributes the encoding of each character over a long time period, and over several tones. This code and symbol spreading implementation is key to its robustness under less than ideal conditions. The MT63 mode is very tolerant of mistuning, as most software will handle 120 Hz tuning offsets under normal conditions.

Latency 
One shortcoming of MT63 is that robustness is somewhat compromised with the short interleaver. 

Latency (delay between transmitted characters) is more than 6 seconds with the long interleaver.

The typical character transmission delay is 12.8 seconds with long interleave mode.

Media

MT63 is seeing a resurgence in its popularity on shortwave with the VOA Radiogram  but the software used to encode the text is not using the Varicode that MT63 used in its original design. 

Modern software that codes MT63, such as Fldigi, has opted for base128  that is essentially ASCII-7. However, the only interleaving options have become long and short, as the medium interleaving mode has become redundant.

MT63 has been promoted as a modulation format for Time Signal Stations, but the implied system does not use Varicode.

See also 
 Walsh code
 Varicode
 Radioteletype
 Shortwave radio
 PSK63

References

Related links 
 "MT63 Technical Information", ZL1BPU website (archived 2008)
 "MT63", ZL1BPU website (archived 2008)
 BARTG site - British Amateur Radio Teledata Group
 Fldigi MT63
 MT63 mooted as a time transfer technology

Quantized radio modulation modes